Quest is an esoteric quarterly magazine containing material on magic, witchcraft, and practical occultism, along with personal experiences and reviews. It has been edited since its inception in 1970 by the author Marian Green, who also organises an associated annual Quest Conference. 

Its 169th issue was published in March 2012 and included articles by herbalist author Val Thomas, editor of The Cauldron Mike Howard, and Diana Demdike, an early collaborator of Green.

References

External links

1970 establishments in the United Kingdom
Magazines established in 1970
Modern pagan magazines
Modern paganism in the United Kingdom
Quarterly magazines published in the United Kingdom
Religious magazines published in the United Kingdom
Western esoteric magazines